Main Agar Chup Hoon (Urdu: میں اگر چپ ہوں, lit. 'If I am quiet') is a 2020 Pakistani romantic soap television series, produced by Abdullah Kadwani and Asad Qureshi under 7th Sky Entertainment. It stars Fatima Effendi and Adeel Chaudhry in lead roles in their second project together, the first being Munafiq, along with Hammad Farooqui and Sehar Khan in parallel lead roles. The supporting cast include Sajida Syed, Farhan Ally Agha, Ayesha Gul, Sami Khan, Yasir Shoro, and Sumaiyya Bukhsh. It is written by Saima Wasi and Erum Wasi. It was first broadcast on 23 November 2020 and is shown daily at 19:00 (PST) on Geo Entertainment.

Plot 
Zeeshan feels indebted to his ex-wife, Emaan, for having looked after his family and household expenses at a time when they had cut ties with him for marrying someone else abroad. Now that he is back in his home town, memories reignite his love for Emaan. Emaan finds it hard to choose between her ex-husband and her new fiancé Ahad until he risks his life in an effort to impress her.

Zeeshan's return makes Emaan uncomfortable. Her younger sister, Sehrish, is causing her concern, and her relationship with Ahad is also in trouble.

Cast 
 Fatima Effendi as Emaan
 Adeel Chaudhry as Ahad
 Hammad Farooqui as Zeeshan
 Sehar Khan as Sehrish (Dead)
 Farhan Ally Agha as Alam
 Yasir Shoroo as Atif
 Sumaiyya Bukhsh as Shifa
 Sajida Syed as Bi Jan
 Ayesha Gul as Shameem; Emaan's mother (Dead)
 Nida Mumtaz as Zeeshan's mother
 Khalifa Sajeeruddin as Mubashir; Zeeshan's father
 Sami Khan (child actor) as Zain
 Kanwal Khan
 Yasir Alam
 Hassan Shah

Soundtrack 
The original soundtrack is sung by Shafqat Amanat Ali and Bina Khan, and written by Mubashir Hassan. The OST is composed by Naveed Nashad, son of a noted Pakistani music composer Wajid Nashad.

References

External links 

 

2020 Pakistani television series debuts
Pakistani drama television series
Pakistani romance television series
Pakistani television series
Urdu-language television shows
Pakistani romantic drama television series